In enzymology, a D-arabinokinase is an enzyme that catalyzes the chemical reaction

ATP + D-arabinose  ADP + D-arabinose 5-phosphate

Thus, the two substrates of this enzyme are ATP and D-arabinose, whereas its two products are ADP and D-arabinose 5-phosphate.

This enzyme belongs to the family of transferases, specifically those transferring phosphorus-containing groups (phosphotransferases) with an alcohol group as acceptor.  The systematic name of this enzyme class is ATP:D-arabinose 5-phosphotransferase. This enzyme is also called D-arabinokinase (phosphorylating).

References 

 

EC 2.7.1
Enzymes of unknown structure